Fatima Yvelain (born 31 December 1969) is a French long-distance runner. She competed in the women's 10,000 metres at the 2000 Summer Olympics.

References

1969 births
Living people
Athletes (track and field) at the 2000 Summer Olympics
French female long-distance runners
Olympic athletes of France
Place of birth missing (living people)